Radha Mohan Sharma (born 29 October 1961) is an Indian politician belonging to the Bharatiya Janata Party. He is currently serving as vice-president of BJP Bihar unit and was a member of the Bihar Legislative Council for (2019–20).

Political background 
Radha Mohan Sharma joined Akhil Bharatiya Vidyarthi Parishad in 1980. and appointed as Jehanabad secretary of Akhil Bharatiya Vidyarthi Parishad in 1981. Later in 1989 He took BJP Membership in-charge Mandal and served as the Jehanabad District President of the Bharatiya Janata Party (BJP) from 2003 to 2006.

In 2005 Radha Mohan Sharma contested Bihar Legislative Assembly as a BJP candidate from Jehanabad constituency. Later He served as BJP Regional in-charge from 2009 to 2013 and from 2014 to 2017 as a State In-charge for Scheduled front, Trible front, Mahadalit front.

In 2017 Radha Mohan Sharma became as General Secretary of Bihar BJP and in 2019 He worked as a  BJP Membership in-charge in  Bihar State and From 2020 He has been serving as a Vice-president of BJP Bihar.

References 

1961 births
Living people
Indian politicians
Members of the Bihar Legislative Council
Bharatiya Janata Party politicians from Bihar